Love ni Mister, Love ni Misis is a Philippine television lifestyle talk show broadcast by GMA Network. Hosted by Carmina Villaroel and Zoren Legaspi, it premiered on August 9, 2010. The show concluded on March 4, 2011 with a total of 150 episodes.

Ratings
According to AGB Nielsen Philippines' Mega Manila People/Individual television ratings, the pilot episode of Love ni Mister, Love ni Misis earned a 3.9% rating. While the final episode scored a 3.3% rating.

Accolades

References

External links
 

2010 Philippine television series debuts
2011 Philippine television series endings
Filipino-language television shows
GMA Network original programming
Philippine television talk shows